Ord v Belhaven Pubs Ltd [1998] 2 BCLC 447 is a UK company law case concerning piercing the corporate veil.

Facts
Mr and Mrs Ord ran the Fox Inn in Stamford, Lincolnshire. They were in an ongoing dispute with the freehold owner, Belhaven Pubs Ltd, for misrepresentation about the level of profitability of the pub. However Belhaven Pubs Ltd was part of a company group structure that had been reorganised, and had no assets left. Mr and Mrs Ord requested that a company with money,  Ascott Holdings Ltd, be substituted for Belhaven Pubs Ltd to enforce the judgment. At first instance the judge granted this order. Belhaven Pubs Ltd appealed.

Judgment
The Court of Appeal overturned the judgement and held that the reorganisation was a legitimate one, and not done to avoid an existing obligation. Hobhouse LJ argued that the reorganisation, even though it resulted in Belhaven Pubs Ltd having no further assets, was done as part of a response to the group's financial crisis. There was no ulterior motive.

Hobhouse LJ also held, specifically, that the earlier case of Creasey v Breachwood Motors Ltd was wrong.

See also

UK company law
Lifting the corporate veil

Notes

References

United Kingdom company case law
United Kingdom corporate personality case law
Court of Appeal (England and Wales) cases
1998 in case law
1998 in British law